Jair da Rosa Pinto (21 March 1921 – 28 July 2005), or simply Jair, was an association footballer who played offensive midfielder – one of the leading Brazilian footballers of the 1940s and 1950s, who is best remembered for his performance in Brazil's 1950 FIFA World Cup campaign. Usually playing as an inside-forward, Jair da Rosa was noted for his free-role style of play and was most known for his pace and technical ability.

History

Pre-1950
Born March 21, 1921, in Quatis, Rio de Janeiro, Jair started his career as a left winger at Madureira (in Rio) in 1938. He made his debut for the Brazil squad just two years later, on the March 5, 1940, in a 6–1 defeat by Argentina, though Jair did score the goal – the first of 22 he was to score for  Brazil.
 
The Brazilian team regularly featured Jair throughout the 1940s, as his club career led him first to Vasco da Gama, then to Flamengo – remaining in Rio. His greatest moment during this time, however, was in 1944, when he scored a hat-trick against Uruguay, in a friendly at São Paulo. Uruguay would come back to haunt him later, but Jair must have enjoyed playing them during the 1940s, as he scored two doubles against La Celeste Olímpica during 1946 and another in 1949 – the year Brazil won the Copa America with Jair scoring (again) two goals in the second leg of the final, a 7–0 victory against Paraguay.

1950

It was the following year, 1950, that Jair’s talents became appreciated on the world stage, when FIFA held their World Cup tournament in Brazil. Along with Zizinho and Ademir, Jair helped to guide Brazil's team through the tournament with great success. They played with pace, flamboyant skills and were deadly in front of goal, winning friends the world over with their attacking play – scoring 22 goals in 6 World Cup games – before falling to Uruguay in a match that was, effectively, the World Cup Final – a game in which Jair hit the post during Brazil’s early domination, but could do nothing to stop Uruguay recovering from an early Friaca goal to triumph 2–1 and send the 200,000 fans in the Maracana Stadium, which had been built especially for the World Cup, home disappointed.

Football has always had special importance in Brazil, indeed, celebrated Brazilian writer Nelson Rodrigues was moved to say of the game "Everywhere has its irremediable national catastrophe, something like a Hiroshima. Our catastrophe, our Hiroshima, was the defeat by Uruguay in 1950" – it was a defeat so devastating that it led to the Brazil national team changing their shirts to the famous yellow of today and even now is referred to as ‘The Defeat’ in Brazil.

Post-1950

Jair was quoted later as saying "I'll take that loss to my grave", and he was certainly given time to reflect on The Defeat, cast out of the national side until January 1956 – returning for a 2-game cameo before being replaced by other, bigger names – and moving around the clubs of São Paulo – with longer, more successful spells at Palmeiras and Santos FC than the São Paulo FC and Ponte Preta clubs he represented later in his career before he retired, in 1963, at the age of 42.

When his playing career was over, Jair coached a number of teams, including Santos, Palmeiras and his first club, Madureira and is given credit for, during his playing time at Santos helping to bring the greatest player of them all, Pelé, through into the Santos team.

Jair died of a lung infection on July 21, 2005, at the age of 84, in Rio de Janeiro. He made 39 appearances for the Brazil national football team, scoring 22 goals.

The former President of Brazil, Jair Bolsonaro, was born on his 34th birthday and is named after him.

Honours

Clubs
Rio State Championship 1945
São Paulo State Championship 1950, 1956, 1958, 1960
Rio-São Paulo Tournament 1951, 1959
1951 Copa Rio

International
1950 FIFA World Cup – Runner-up
1949 Copa America – Winner

Individual
Copa América Top Scorer: 1949
FIFA World Cup All-Star Team: 1950

References

External links
Profile at cbf.com.br
 

1921 births
2005 deaths
Brazilian footballers
1950 FIFA World Cup players
1949 South American Championship players
Brazil international footballers
Association football wingers
Copa América-winning players
Brazilian football managers
Madureira Esporte Clube players
CR Vasco da Gama players
CR Flamengo footballers
Sociedade Esportiva Palmeiras players
Santos FC players
São Paulo FC players
Associação Atlética Ponte Preta players
São Paulo FC managers
Esporte Clube Vitória managers
Santos FC managers
Fluminense FC managers
Clube Atlético Juventus managers
Sportspeople from Rio de Janeiro (state)